Ed Taylor may refer to:
Ed Taylor (American football) (b. 1953), American football player
Ed Taylor (pitcher) (1877–1912), American baseball pitcher
Ed Taylor (infielder) (1901–1992), American baseball infielder

See also
Edward Taylor (disambiguation)
Edwin Taylor (disambiguation)